Dijon Métropole is the métropole, an intercommunal structure, centered around the city of Dijon. It is located in the Côte-d'Or department, in the Bourgogne-Franche-Comté region, eastern France. It was created in April 2017, replacing the previous Communauté urbaine du Grand Dijon.  Its area is 240.0 km2. Its population was 253,859 in 2018, of which 156,854 in Dijon proper.

Composition
The Dijon Métropole consists of the following 23 communes:

Ahuy
Bressey-sur-Tille
Bretenière
Chenôve
Chevigny-Saint-Sauveur
Corcelles-les-Monts
Daix
Dijon
Fénay
Flavignerot
Fontaine-lès-Dijon
Hauteville-lès-Dijon
Longvic
Magny-sur-Tille
Marsannay-la-Côte
Neuilly-Crimolois
Ouges
Perrigny-lès-Dijon
Plombières-lès-Dijon
Quetigny
Saint-Apollinaire
Sennecey-lès-Dijon
Talant

References

Dijon
Dijon
Dijon